Code page 859 (CCSID 859) (also known as CP 859 and IBM 00859) is a code page used under DOS to write Western European languages. It contains all of the characters in ISO 8859-15.

Character set
Each character is shown with its equivalent Unicode code point. Only the second half of the table (code points 128–255) is shown, the first half (code points 0–127) being the same as code page 850.

References

859